José Joaquín Arcega-Whiteside (born December 31, 1996) is a Spanish-born American football wide receiver, who is a free agent. He played college football at Stanford and was drafted by the Philadelphia Eagles in the second round of the 2019 NFL Draft.

Early years
Arcega-Whiteside was born in Utebo, Spain, on December 31, 1996, and moved to South Carolina in the United States when he was six. He attended Paul M. Dorman High School in Roebuck, South Carolina. During his career, he had 207 receptions for 3,779 yards and 38 touchdowns. Arcega-Whiteside committed to Stanford University to play college football.

College career
After redshirting his first year at Stanford in 2015, Arcega-Whiteside played in 12 games as a sophomore, recording 24 receptions for 379 yards and five touchdowns. As a junior in 2017, he had 48 receptions for 781 yards and nine touchdowns. As a senior in 2018, he had a season record of 63 receptions for 1,059 yards and 14 touchdowns. After the season, Arcega-Whiteside declared for the 2019 NFL Draft.

College statistics

Professional career

Philadelphia Eagles

Arcega-Whiteside was drafted by the Philadelphia Eagles in the second round (57th overall) of the 2019 NFL Draft. In Week 13, in the 37–31 loss to the Miami Dolphins, Arcega-Whiteside caught one pass for 15 yards for his first professional touchdown. Overall in 2019, he caught ten passes for 169 yards and one touchdown.

In Week 6 of the 2020 season against the Baltimore Ravens, Arcega-Whiteside caught his first two-point conversion and recovered a Miles Sanders fumble for a touchdown in the 30–28 loss. Arcega-Whiteside was placed on the reserve/COVID-19 list by the Eagles on November 19, 2020, and activated on December 2. Overall, his second season was less productive, catching only 4 passes over 8 games played.

Arcega-Whiteside entered the 2021 season fifth on the Eagles wide receiver depth chart. He was placed on injured reserve on January 10, 2022. He finished the season with just two catches for 39 yards and no touchdowns through 16 games.

During the 2022 offseason, Arcega-Whiteside converted from wide receiver to tight end.

Seattle Seahawks
On August 15, 2022, Arcega-Whiteside was traded to the Seattle Seahawks for cornerback Ugo Amadi. He was waived on August 30, 2022 and signed to the practice squad the next day. He was released on November 1, 2022.

Personal life
Both of his parents, Joaquín Arcega and Valorie Whiteside, played professional basketball in Spain. Arcega is Spanish and Whiteside is an African American from South Carolina. Valorie Whiteside played college basketball at Appalachian State and is the all-time leading scorer in women's basketball for the Southern Conference. She later played professionally in Europe and met Joaquín Arcega in Spain. Two of Arcega's uncles, Fernando Arcega and José Arcega, also played basketball professionally in Spain and represented Spain in the Olympics.

While at Stanford, Arcega-Whiteside majored in international relations. He interned with the office of former Secretary of State Condoleezza Rice.

References

External links
Philadelphia Eagles bio
Stanford Cardinal bio

1996 births
Living people
American football tight ends
American football wide receivers
People from Inman, South Carolina
Players of American football from South Carolina
Spanish players of American football
Sportspeople from the Province of Zaragoza
Stanford Cardinal football players
Philadelphia Eagles players
Seattle Seahawks players
Spanish emigrants to the United States